The Hollywood Post Alliance Award for Outstanding Visual Effects in a Feature Film is an annual award, given by the Hollywood Post Alliance, or HPA, to post production workers in the film and television industry, in this case visual effects artists . It was first awarded in 2006, and, outside of 2007 and 2008, has been presented every year since. From 2006 to 2012, the category was titled Hollywood Post Alliance Award for Outstanding Compositing - Feature Film.

Winners and nominees

2000s
Outstanding Compositing - Feature Film

2010s

Outstanding Visual Effects - Feature Film

References

American film awards
Film awards for Best Visual Effects